Justice Sloan may refer to:

 D. Lindley Sloan (1874–1962), chief judge of the Maryland Court of Appeals
 Edward Ray Sloan (1883–1964), associate justice of the Kansas Supreme Court
 Gordon Sloan (1911–2006), associate justice of the Oregon Supreme Court
 Richard Elihu Sloan (1857–1933), associate justice of the Arizona Territorial Supreme Court

See also
Judge Sloan (disambiguation)
William A. Sloane, associate justice of the California Supreme Court